Brentwood Middle and High School is a public high school in Brentwood, St. Louis County, Missouri that is part of the Brentwood School District. Brentwood High School was selected as a National Blue Ribbon School in 2006. Brentwood High School opened in 1927, and in 1961, the school district added a junior high school addition to the building.

Activities
For the 2013–2014 school year, the school offered 15 activities approved by the Missouri State High School Activities Association (MSHSAA): baseball, boys and girls basketball, sideline cheerleading, field hockey, 11-man football, music activities, boys and girls soccer, softball, speech and debate, boys and girls track and field, girls volleyball, and wrestling In addition to its current activities, Brentwood students have won several state championships, including:
Football: Runner up 2009
Baseball: 1978, 1986
Girls basketball: 1985
Boys track and field: 1963, 1964, 1965, 1966, 1967, 1968, 1987, 1991
Winter Color Guard: 2012
The school also has had two state individual champions in wrestling, Rodney Carr (1973) and Greg Carr (1983).

Alumni
Ivory Crockett: World-record-setting sprinter
Herta Feely: Co-founder of Safe Kids Worldwide

References

Educational institutions established in 1927
High schools in St. Louis County, Missouri
Public high schools in Missouri
1927 establishments in Missouri
Buildings and structures in St. Louis County, Missouri